Rhodes Pharmacy is a historic pharmacy building located at Newark in New Castle County, Delaware.  It was built in 1917 and is a two-story, rectangular brick commercial building with a concrete  Gothic Revival facade.

It was added to the National Register of Historic Places in 1983.

References

Commercial buildings on the National Register of Historic Places in Delaware
Gothic Revival architecture in Delaware
Commercial buildings completed in 1917
Buildings and structures in Newark, Delaware
Defunct pharmacies of the United States
1917 establishments in Delaware
National Register of Historic Places in New Castle County, Delaware
Health care companies based in Delaware
Pharmacies on the National Register of Historic Places